HD 117207 b is an extrasolar planet orbiting at 3.79 astronomical units taking about 2597 days to complete its orbit around HD 117207. Its orbit is moderate in eccentricity. This planet was announced in January 2005 by Marcy in Keck Observatory. The planet has at least 1.88 Jupiter masses.

References

External links 
 

Giant planets
Centaurus (constellation)
Exoplanets discovered in 2005
Exoplanets detected by radial velocity